was a Japanese politician. He was a member of the House of Representatives (1969–1972, 1980–1996).

References

2014 deaths
Japanese politicians
Year of birth missing